Prosopis juliflora (Aippia Wayuunaiki and long-thorn kiawe in Hawaii) is a shrub or small tree in the family Fabaceae, a kind of mesquite. It is native to Mexico, South America and the Caribbean. It has become established as an invasive weed in Africa, Asia, Australia and elsewhere. It is a contributing factor to continuing transmission of malaria, especially during dry periods when sugar sources from native plants are largely unavailable to mosquitoes.

Description
Its leaves are deciduous, geminate-pinnate, light green, with 12 to 20 leaflets. Flowers appear shortly after leaf development. A mature plant can produce hundreds
of thousands of seeds. Seeds remain viable for up to 10 years. The tree reproduces solely by way of seeds, not vegetatively. Seeds are spread by cattle and other animals, which consume the seed pods and spread the seeds in their droppings.

The tree is said to have been introduced to Sri Lanka in the 19th century, where it is now known as vanni-andara, or katu andara in Sinhala. It is claimed that P. juliflora existed and was recognised even as a holy tree in ancient India, but this is most likely a confusion with P. cineraria. The tree is believed to have existed in the Vanni and Mannar regions for a long time. This species has thorns in pairs at the nodes. The species has variable thorniness, with nearly thornless individuals appearing occasionally.

In the western extent of its range in Ecuador and Peru, P. juliflora readily hybridises with P. pallida and can be difficult to distinguish from this similar species or their interspecific hybrid strains.

Nomenclature

Vernacular names
Prosopis juliflora has a wide range of vernacular names, although no widely used English one except for mesquite, which is used for several species of Prosopis. It is called bayahonda blanca in Spanish, bayarone Français in French, and bayawonn in Creole. Other similar names are also used, including bayahonde, bayahonda and bayarone, but these may also refer to any other Neotropical member of the genus Prosopis. The tree is known by a range of other names in various parts of the world, including algarrobe, cambrón, cashaw, épinard, mesquite, mostrenco, or mathenge. Many of the less-specific names are because over large parts of its range, it is the most familiar and common species of Prosopis, and thus to locals simply "the" bayahonde, algarrobe, etc. "Velvet mesquite" is sometimes given as an English name, but properly refers to a different species, P. velutina.

Synonyms
This plant has been described under a number of now-invalid scientific names:
Acacia cumanensis Willd.
Acacia juliflora (Sw.) Willd.
Acacia salinarum (Vahl) DC.
Algarobia juliflora (Sw.) Heynh.
Algarobia juliflora as defined by G. Bentham refers only to the typical variety, Prosopis juliflora var. juliflora (Sw.) DC
Desmanthus salinarum (Vahl) Steud.
Mimosa juliflora Sw.
Mimosa piliflora Sw.
Mimosa salinarum Vahl
Neltuma bakeri Britton & Rose
Neltuma juliflora (Sw.) Raf.
Neltuma occidenatlis Britton & Rose
Neltuma occidentalis Britton & Rose
Neltuma pallescens Britton & Rose
Prosopis bracteolata DC.
Prosopis cumanensis (Willd.) Kunth
Prosopis domingensis DC.
Prosopis dulcis Kunth var. domingensis (DC.)Benth.
C.S. Kunth's Prosopis dulcis is Smooth Mesquite (P. laevigata), while P. dulcis as described by W.J. Hooker is Caldén (P. caldenia).
Prosopis vidaliana Fern.-Vill.

Prosopis chilensis was sometimes considered to belong here too, but is now usually considered a separate species. Several other authors misapplied P. chilensis to P. glandulosa (honey mesquite).

Etymology 
Names in and around Indian Subcontinent, where the species is widely used for firewood and to make barriers, often compare it to similar trees and note its introduced status; thus in Hindi it is called angaraji babul, Kabuli kikar, vilayati babul, vilayati khejra or vilayati kikar. The angaraji and vilayati names mean they were introduced by Europeans, while Kabuli kikar (or keekar) means "Kabul acacia"; babul specifically refers to Acacia nilotica and khejra (or khejri) to P. cineraria, both of which are native to South Asia.In Maharashtra it is known as "Katkali (काटकळी)". In Gujarati it is called gando baval (ગાંડો બાવળ- literally translating to "the mad tree") and in Marwari, baavlia. In Kannada it is known as Ballaari Jaali ( ಬಳ್ಳಾರಿ ಜಾಲಿ) meaning "Jaali", local name, abundant in and around Bellary district. In Andhra Pradesh and Telangana, in the Telugu language it is known as mulla tumma (ముల్ల తుమ్మ),sarkar tumma,"chilla chettu","Japan Tumma Chettu", "Seema Jaali", or "Kampa Chettu." In Malayalam, it is known as "Mullan."
A vernacular. The Somali name is 'Garan-waa' which means 'the unknown'.
In the Wayuu language, spoken on the La Guajira Peninsula in northern Colombia and Venezuela, it is called trupillo or turpío. In Kenya it is called Mathenge.

As an invasive species 
P. juliflora has become an invasive weed in several countries where it was introduced.
It is considered a noxious invader in Ethiopia, Hawaii, Sri Lanka, Jamaica, Kenya, the Middle East, India, Nigeria, Sudan, Somalia, Senegal, South Africa, Namibia and Botswana. It is also a major weed in the southwestern United States. It is hard and expensive to remove as the plant can regenerate from the roots.

With its thorns and many low branches it forms impenetrable thickets which prevent cattle from accessing watering holes, etc. It also takes over pastoral grasslands and uses scarce water. Livestock which consume excessive amounts of seed pods are poisoned due to neurotoxic alkaloids. It causes land erosion due to the loss of the grasslands that are habitats for native plants and animals. It also provides shelter for feral animals such as pigs and cats.

In the Afar Region in Ethiopia, where the mesquite was introduced in the late 1970s and early 1980s, its aggressive growth leads to a monoculture, denying native plants water and sunlight, and not providing food for native animals and cattle. The regional government with the non-governmental organisation FARM-Africa are looking for ways to commercialize the tree's wood, but pastoralists who call it the "Devil Tree" insist that P. juliflora be eradicated.

In Sri Lanka this mesquite was planted in the 1950s near Hambantota as a shade and erosion control tree. It then invaded the grasslands in and around Hambantota and the Bundala National Park, causing similar problems as in Australia and Ethiopia. P. juliflora native to Central and South America is also known as katu andara. It was introduced in 1880 and has become a serious problem as an invasive species.

In the Indian state of Tamil Nadu, Prosopis juliflora has emerged as an invasive species. The plant was first introduced by the British in 1877 as part of an effort to plant it along the arid tracts of Southern India. During the 1960s the state government of Tamil Nadu encouraged the planting of Prosopis juliflora to overcome the shortage of firewood faced by the state at the time, it was also grown as a fence to protect agricultural fields from animals. In 2017, the Madurai bench of the Madras High Court ordered the state government to eradicate the species from the state. In 2022, unsatisfied with the state government, the Madras High Court directed the government to immediately frame a policy to eradicate the plant. The state on 13 July 2022 unveiled a policy to eliminate the invasive species.

In Europe, P. juliflora is included since 2019 in the list of Invasive Alien Species of Union concern (the Union list). This implies that this species cannot be imported, cultivated, transported, commercialized, planted, or intentionally released into the environment in the whole of the European Union.

Uses 
The sweet pods are edible and nutritious, and have been a traditional source of food for indigenous peoples in Peru, Chile and California. Pods were once chewed during long journeys to stave off thirst. They can be eaten raw, boiled, dried and ground into flour to make bread, stored underground, or fermented to make a mildly alcoholic beverage. Prior to Spanish colonization, the Guaraní people of South America brewed a beer from mashed Carob pods and wild honey.

The species' uses also include forage, wood and environmental management. The plant possesses an unusual amount of the flavanol (-)-mesquitol in its heartwood.

In the Macará Canton of Ecuador, P. juliflora can be found in dry forests where it is one of the species most frequently harvested for multiple forest products.

References

Further reading
  (1983): Prosopis juliflora DC.. In: Handbook of Energy Crops. Purdue University Center for New Crops & Plant Products. Version of 1998-JAN-08. Retrieved 2008-MAR-19.
  (2005): Prosopis juliflora. Version 10.01, November 2005. Retrieved 2007-DEC-20.
  (2007): Uso, manejo y conservacion de "yosú", Stenocereus griseus (Cactaceae) en la Alta Guajira colombiana [Usage, Management and Conservation of yosú, Stenocereus griseus (Cactaceae), in the Upper Guajira, Colombia]. [Spanish with English abstract] Acta Biológica Colombiana 12(1): 99-112. PDF fulltext

External links

 Long-thorn Kiawe  Hawaii Invasive Species Council
 Prosopis juliflora (mesquite) - CABI Invasive Species Compendium
 Long-thorn Kiawe  Kauai Invasive Species Committee (KISC)
 Prosopis juliflora (Fabaceae)  Hawaiian Ecosystems at Risk
 Prosopis juliflora  Pacific Island Ecosystems at Risk  Hawaiian Ecosystems at Risk
 Prosopis juliflora  GISD

juliflora
Flora of the Caribbean
Trees of Central America
Trees of Colombia
Trees of Ecuador
Trees of Mexico
Trees of Guatemala
Trees of Venezuela
Flora of Northeastern Mexico
Plants described in 1825
Invasive plant species in Sri Lanka
Forages
Drought-tolerant trees
Trees of the Dominican Republic
Flora without expected TNC conservation status